Mário Almaský (born 25 June 1991) is a Slovak football midfielder who plays for OŠK Bešeňová.

MFK Ružomberok 
Mário made his official debut for Ružomberok on 16 May 2012, playing the last 14 minutes in a 0–3 away lost against Spartak Trnava, replacing Juraj Vavrík.

References

External links
 
 Eurofotbal.cz profile 
 Mário Almaský at MFK Ružomberok (archive) 
 

1991 births
Living people
Association football midfielders
Slovak footballers
MFK Ružomberok players
FK Železiarne Podbrezová players
FC ŠTK 1914 Šamorín players
Slovak Super Liga players
2. Liga (Slovakia) players